Mmhmm is the fourth full-length studio album by American Christian rock band Relient K, released on November 2, 2004, by Gotee and Capitol Records. This album includes their breakthrough singles "Be My Escape" and "Who I Am Hates Who I've Been" and also earned the group a Canadian Juno Award nomination for Contemporary Christian/Gospel Album of the Year in 2006. It was certified Gold in 2005 by the RIAA for sales in excess of 500,000 units in the United States and has sold over 800,000 copies in the US. It won the 2006 Dove Award for Rock Album of the Year at the 37th GMA Dove Awards.

Release
The album was the band's first on Capitol Records; and bassist Brian Pittman's last album with the band. In addition to being released on Capitol and Gotee, Mmhmm was re-released on vinyl on Mono Vs Stereo. The re-release includes a song originally from Apathetic EP, called "Apathetic Way to Be". The singles "Be My Escape" and "Who I Am Hates Who I've Been", both found on Mmhmm, boosted Relient K's mainstream popularity. Although the song "High of 75" was never released to mainstream markets, it spent fifteen consecutive weeks in the CCM top ten.

In February 2005, Relient K toured the Southern US states with Mae and Name Taken. They appeared at The Bamboozle festival in April 2005. In May and June 2005, the group supported Good Charlotte and Simple Plan on their co-headlining US tour. Between mid June and mid August, the group went on the 2005 edition of Warped Tour. "Who I Am Hates Who I've Been" was released to radio on August 23. In October and November 2005, they embarked on a headlining US tour, with support from MxPx, Rufio and Over It. Between February and April 2006, the group went on The Matt Hoopes Birthday Tour, with support from the Rocket Summer and Maxeen. Following this, they appeared at The Bamboozle festival.

Reception

Mmhmm earned the group a Canadian Juno Award nomination for Contemporary Christian/Gospel Album of the Year in 2006. In 2005, Mmhmm was certified Gold by the RIAA for sales in excess of 500,000 units in the United States. It has sold over 800,000 copies in the United States. In 2006, the album won a Dove Award for Rock Album of the Year at the 37th GMA Dove Awards. It was also nominated for Recorded Music Packaging of the Year. The songs "Be My Escape" and "Who I Am Hates Who I've Been" received nominations as well.

Track listing

Personnel 
Relient K
 Matt Thiessen – vocals, acoustic piano, keyboards, guitars, percussion 
 Matt Hoopes – vocals, guitars 
 Brian Pittman – bass
 Dave Douglas – vocals, drums

Additional personnel
 Rob Roy Fingerhead – banjo, extra guitars, percussion
 Tony Lucido – bass
 David Henry – cello
 Chris Carmichael – viola, violin 
 David Bunton – additional vocals (4, 8, 13)
 Kevin Kiehn – additional vocals (4)
 John Warne – additional vocals (7, 10)
 John Davis – additional vocals (9, 14)

Production 
 Joey Elwood – executive producer 
 Toby McKeehan – executive producer 
 Mark Lee Townsend – producer, additional engineer 
 Matt Thiessen – producer 
 Joe Marlett – engineer
 Michael Modesto – second engineer 
 Dave Salley – second engineer 
 J.R. McNeely – mixing (0, 1, 4, 5, 7-14)
 Tom Lord-Alge – mixing (2, 3, 6)
 Matt "Mat5t" Weeks – mix assistant (0, 1, 4, 5, 7-14)
 Jim DeMain – mastering at Yes Master (Nashville, Tennessee)
 Ted Jensen – mastering at Sterling Sound (New York City, New York)
 Grant Harrison – A&R 
 Eddy Boer – creative direction
 Greg Leppert – creative direction, design, illustration 
 Alabaster Arts – management

Charts

Weekly charts

Year-end charts

Singles

Christian radio-only singles:

 "High of 75"
 "I So Hate Consequences"
 "Life After Death and Taxes (Failure II)"

Tenth anniversary 

On December 9, 2014, the album was reissued for the tenth anniversary of the album's release. The reissue, Mmhmm10 was available as a deluxe edition CD and a digital download, while a vinyl edition of the original album, that also included a copy of the deluxe CD, was also released. The band toured around the United States for the anniversary.

References 

Relient K albums
2004 albums
Capitol Records albums
Gotee Records albums
Albums produced by Mark Lee Townsend